Georgi Shangin (born February 21, 1989) is a Russian former professional ice hockey defenceman.

Shangin played one game in the Kontinental Hockey League for Spartak Moscow during the 2011–12 season. He also played in Vysshaya Liga for CSK VVS Samara and the Supreme Hockey League for Dynamo Tver, Sokol Krasnoyarsk, Zauralie Kurgan, HC Sarov and Ariada Volzhsk.

References

External links

1989 births
Living people
Ariada Volzhsk players
HC CSK VVS Samara players
HK Dukla Michalovce players
Russian ice hockey defencemen
HC Sarov players
Sokol Krasnoyarsk players
HC Spartak Moscow players
Sportspeople from Yekaterinburg
Zauralie Kurgan players
Russian expatriate sportspeople in Slovakia
Expatriate ice hockey players in Slovakia
Russian expatriate ice hockey people